St. Mary's College, Dundalk is a secondary school in County Louth, Ireland. It consists of a mixed school which provides junior certificate and leaving certificate programmes.

History

Notable alumni
Dermot Ahern – Politician and Government Minister
Joseph Finnegan – Judge of the Supreme Court of Ireland and President of the Irish High Court
Neil Gallagher – Sportsman
Larry Goodman – Businessman and billionaire
Fred Halliday – Writer
Sir Denis Henry, 1st Baronet – first Lord Chief Justice of Northern Ireland, a Barrister (Queen's Counsel), Solicitor-General for Ireland, Attorney General for Ireland, and Bencher of the Honorable Society of King's Inns.
David Kennedy – Marist Father
Brendan McGahon – Politician
Israel Olatunde - Professional track and field athlete, record holder for fastest Irish man in history

See also
St Mary's College, Dublin

References

Educational institutions established in 1861
Catholic secondary schools in the Republic of Ireland
Secondary schools in County Louth
1861 establishments in Ireland